Piet Bakker is a Dutch sprint canoeist who competed in the late 1940s and early 1950s. He won a bronze medal in the K-2 1000 m event at the 1950 ICF Canoe Sprint World Championships in Copenhagen.

References

Dutch male canoeists
Possibly living people
Year of birth missing
ICF Canoe Sprint World Championships medalists in kayak